The United States–Jordan Free Trade Agreement is the first free trade agreement (FTA) between the United States and an Arab country (and the United States' fourth FTA overall behind Israel, Canada, and Mexico).  It is Jordan's second free trade agreement, after the 1997 Greater Arab Free Trade Agreement. The agreement, which grants duty-free status to nearly all Jordanian exports to the United States, was signed on 24 October 2000 and went into force on 17 December 2001. Rules of origin require that goods be composed of a minimum of 35 percent Jordanian content to be eligible for duty-free entry.

As a result of the agreement, Jordan became a "magnet for apparel manufacturing," as U.S. companies such as Walmart, Target, and Hanes established factories so they could cut costs by eliminating tariffs. In 2019, U.S. exports to Jordan were $1.5 billion, while imports were $2.2 billion, about 80 percent of which were apparel and textile goods.

Support in the United States
The U.S. House of Representatives ratified the FTA on 31 July 2001 and the U.S. Senate ratified it on 7 December 2001; both were by voice vote, an indication of its widespread support. President George W. Bush signed the United States–Jordan Free Trade Area Implementation Act into law on 28 September 2001. It went into effect on 17 December 2001, and was fully implemented on 1 January 2010.

Economic rationale
Unlike many trade agreements, the U.S.–Jordan Free Trade Agreement enjoyed widespread, bipartisan, and multisectoral support. Proponents pointed to the reduction of customs duties and other trade barriers as a boon for exports.

Political rationale
More importantly, the U.S. government looked to the political gains to make the FTA worthwhile; economic gains for U.S. businesses, if any, were expected to be small. Ideally, the "economic linkages" generated by the FTA would "normalize strained relationships and offer institutional mechanisms to resolve and prevent political disputes." This, in turn, would act as the "turning point in which hope begins to replace the despair on which violent extremists breed," as Assistant Secretary for the Bureau of Near Eastern Affairs William Burns put it. The assumption was that in the course of jointly controlling and valuating rules of origin, Jordanian and Israeli customs officers would engage in interpersonal interactions resulting in understanding if not friendship. 

In other words, the U.S. government has adopted a neoliberal worldview that believes stronger economic relations will bring about peace and stability in the Middle East.

Impact

Textile industry
Jordan became a "magnet for apparel manufacturing," as U.S. companies such as Walmart, Target, and Hanes established factories so they could cut costs by eliminating tariffs. In the FTA's first year, Jordan had increased exports by 213% and created 30,000 jobs. By 2002 Jordan enjoyed a marginal trade surplus with the United States. 

Five years after the FTA came into effect, Jordanian exports to the United States had increased twentyfold; Jordan's apparel exports to the United States in 2005 amounted to $1.2 billion. Most of Jordan's exports to the United States come from one of 114 companies.

Labor conditions
In 2006 the National Labor Committee, a U.S. non-governmental organization, released a series of reports on Jordanian sweatshops, whose conditions according to the NLC's executive director were "the worst:" 20-hour workdays, not being paid for months, and physical abuse. Most laborers are not Jordanians; they are contracted guest workers from countries such as Bangladesh, Sri Lanka, and China who pay a lump sum of about $2,000 to $3,000 to get hired by a garment factory. However, some factories then confiscate their passports, subjecting them to de facto involuntary servitude bordering on human trafficking. Many members of Congress expressed concern, especially because the Jordan FTA was lauded as "historic and progressive" for including labor and environmental provisions "directly within the agreement as opposed to being in a side agreement".

See also
 Rules of Origin
 Market access
 Free-trade area
 Tariffs

References

External links
 Congressional Research Service Report on Jordan FTA
 Congressional Research Service Report on Jordan FTA and Labor Issues
 Citizens' Trade Campaign Site on Jordan FTA

Economy of Jordan
Free trade agreements of the United States
Treaties of Jordan
Treaties concluded in 2000
Treaties entered into force in 2001
Acts of the 107th United States Congress
Jordan–United States relations